Donald M. Lloyd-Jones is an American epidemiologist who is currently the Eileen M. Foell Professor at Northwestern University.

Education
He earned his M.D. at Columbia University in 1991.

Research
His interests are preventative medicine, cardiology and aging. His highest cited paper is "Heart disease and stroke statistics" at 6043 times, according to Google Scholar.

Selected publications

References

Year of birth missing (living people)
Living people
Northwestern University faculty
American epidemiologists
Columbia University Vagelos College of Physicians and Surgeons alumni
American cardiologists